The 1932 Maryland Terrapins football team was an American football team that represented the University of Maryland in the Southern Conference (SoCon)  during the 1932 college football season. In their 22nd season under head coach Curley Byrd, the Terrapins compiled a 5–6 record (2–4 against SoCon opponents), finished 16th place in the SoCon, and were outscored by a total of 158 to 148.

Schedule

References

Maryland
Maryland Terrapins football seasons
Maryland Terrapins football